Alejandro Abascal García (born 15 July 1952 in Santander, Cantabria) is a Spanish sailor and Olympic Champion. He competed at the 1980 Summer Olympics in Moscow and won a gold medal in the Flying Dutchman class, together with Miguel Noguer. This was Spain's third Olympic Gold Summer Medal, and their first since 1928.

Previously, he was World champion in Vaurien in 1974 and Spanish Junior national champion in Snipe in 1971.

References

1952 births
Sailors (sport) from Cantabria
Living people
Olympic gold medalists for Spain
Olympic medalists in sailing
Olympic sailors of Spain
Sailors at the 1976 Summer Olympics – Flying Dutchman
Sailors at the 1980 Summer Olympics – Flying Dutchman
Sailors at the 1984 Summer Olympics – Flying Dutchman
Spanish male sailors (sport)
Snipe class sailors
Vaurien class sailors
Sportspeople from Santander, Spain
Medalists at the 1980 Summer Olympics
20th-century Spanish people